Following is a list of senators of Loire-Atlantique, people who have represented the department of Loire-Atlantique in the Senate of France.

Third Republic

Senators for Loire-Atlantique under the French Third Republic were:

 Alexandre de Lavrignais 1876–1886
 Henri Baillardel de Lareinty 1876–1901
 Henri Espivent de la Villesboisnet 1876–1897
 Adolphe Decroix 1886–1894
 Ernest Guibourd de Luzinais 1886–1899 
 Charles Le Cour-Grandmaison 1895–1901
 Augustin Maillard 1897–1920
 Auguste Mercier 1900–1920
 Charles Etienne Gustave Leclerc de Juigné 1900
 Charles Édouard, comte de La Jaille 1901–1920
 Henri Le Cour-Grandmaison 1901–1916
 Fernand du Breil de Pontbriand 1901–1920
 Ambroise de Landemont 1920–1932
 Charles François-Saint-Maur 1920–1941
 Jean Babin-Chevaye  1920–1936
 Jules Léon Jamin 1920–1923 
 Henri-Julien-Marie Busson-Billault 1920–1923
 Pierre de Montaigu 1920–1933
 Jules-Albert de Dion 1923–1941
 Louis Linÿer 1927–1941
 Gustave Gautherot 1932–1941
 Jacques Le Clerc de Juigné 1936–1941

Fourth Republic

Senators for Loire-Atlantique under the French Fourth Republic were:

Fifth Republic 
Senators for Loire-Atlantique under the French Fifth Republic:

References

Sources

 
Lists of members of the Senate (France) by department